Hemidactylus kangerensis is a species of large geckos found in the Eastern Ghats of India.

Hemidactylus kangerensis named after the type location Kanger Ghati National Park.

References

kangerensis
Lizards of Asia
Reptiles of India
Eastern Ghats
Reptiles described in 2017